Palace of the Republic may refer to:

 Palace of the Republic, Banja Luka
 Palace of the Republic, Berlin
 Palace of the Republic, Almaty
 Palace of the Republic, Chișinău
 Palace of the Republic, Minsk